Colorado River Watch is a statewide volunteer water quality monitoring program operated by the non-profit organization Earth Force, in collaboration with Colorado Parks and Wildlife. Its mission is to work with voluntary stewards to monitor water quality and other indicators of watershed health, and utilize this high quality data to educate citizens and inform decision makers about the condition of Colorado's waters. This data is also used in the Clean Water Act decision-making process. River Watch's motto is "Real people doing real science for a real purpose."

Program
River Watch started with six schools in 1989 on the Yampa River. Since then, over 70,000 people have participated with 900 stations, and 400 water bodies on record. River Watch is the largest statewide volunteer monitoring program in the US, with over 4000 samples taken per year. Over 70% of the volunteers are school groups, with citizen groups, individuals, colleges, youth programs, government agencies, and non-profit organizations also volunteering. The goals of River Watch are:
 To collect quality aquatic ecosystem data over space and time to be used water-quality decision making
 To provide hands on experience for individuals to understand the value and function of the river ecosystem

Methods for analysis
River Watch volunteers around the state collect data at their local watersheds and provide this data to River Watch, which organizes and publishes the data. Each volunteer group receives the training, support, and supplies needed to monitor their respective rivers and provide consistent and accurate data. Sampling and analytical procedures follow Standard Methods for the Examination of Water and Wastewater (2001)  and/or EPA guidelines.  Each site is tested for a variety of parameters to give an overall indication of the water health. Additional samples are analyzed by a professional lab for metals, nutrients, and macroinvertebrates.  Quality assurance is essential in the program operation, and data and quality control checks are performed regularly through the year. Twenty percent of all samples from the field are for QA/QC. River Watch data is stored on an Internet server and can be accessed by anyone. All the data is reviewed and validated by the Division of Wildlife before it is made public. The high quality River Watch data is currently utilized by the Colorado Department of Public Health and Environment's Water Quality Control Commission, the Colorado Division of Wildlife, and many grassroots level watershed groups in the state for the management of Colorado’s waters.

Metals, nutrients, and field parameters sampled
Volunteers collect samples for physical, biological, and chemical data components. Physical components, usually measured by volunteers in the field, include pH, dissolved oxygen, hardness, and alkalinity. Biological testing is largely done through macroinvertebrate sampling, completed by an outside laboratory, and indicates the health of the sampled area. Twice a year volunteers collect nutrient samples for analysis of total phosphorus, nitrate and nitrite, ammonia, chloride, sulfate, and total suspended solids. Chemical data components are collected monthly for total and dissolved metals analyses. This includes aluminum, arsenic, calcium, cadmium, copper, iron, magnesium, manganese, lead, sodium, potassium, selenium, and zinc.

Data use 
River Watch data is used to help make decisions regarding the quality of watersheds across Colorado. The Colorado Division of Wildlife regularly uses data to protect the health of fisheries, which in turn influences Colorado recreation and tourism. Under implementation of Colorado’s Clean Water Act, the Water Quality Control Commission (WQCC) uses River Watch data as a primary source for settling and reviewing standards, including annual basin reviews. In 2009, new temperature standards were introduced in the North Platte, Republican, and Airkaree River Basins using River Watch data. The WQCC has also been reviewing and adopting numeric criteria for macroinvertebrate community health; creating a reference river database (comparing healthy to impaired); and developing nutrient standards for nitrogen and phosphorus. In addition, data is utilized by many grassroots level watershed groups. River Watch plays a key part in the decision-making process by providing scientifically sound data to decision makers.

See also
Water quality
Water Quality Act

References

External links 

 River Watch at Colorado Parks & Wildlife

Environmental organizations based in Colorado
Water organizations in the United States